Saint-Nazaire-les-Eymes is a commune in the Isère department in southeastern France. It is part of the Grenoble urban unit (agglomeration).

Population

References

Communes of Isère
Isère communes articles needing translation from French Wikipedia